Mikael Torpegaard was the defending champion but lost in the first round to Taylor Fritz.

Stefan Kozlov won the title after defeating Tennys Sandgren 6–1, 2–6, 6–2 in the final.

Seeds

Draw

Finals

Top half

Bottom half

References
 Main Draw
 Qualifying Draw

Columbus Challenger 2 - Singles
Columbus Challenger